

Events
Italian dictator Benito Mussolini's campaign against the Sicilian Mafia causes many Sicilian mafiosi, organized by Don Vito Cascio Ferro, to flee Italy. Ferro would later prepare to move his criminal operations to the United States before his arrest the following year. 
Joseph Sangerman, leader of Sangerman's Bombers, is arrested and later imprisoned. His death the following year while still awaiting trial would lead to that organization's eventual breakup. 
Carlo Matranga leaves New Orleans to establish the Los Angeles crime syndicate. 
Johnny Jack Nounes, leader of the Downtown Gang, is sent to Leavenworth Penitentiary for liquor charges.
George "Big Bates" Karl, a Sheldon Gang hitman, is killed by the Joe Saltis-Frank McErlane Gang. 
John Barry, a member of the Sheldon Gang, is sentenced to two years for violation of the Volstead Act (Prohibition).
January 12 – North Side Gang members Hymie Weiss, Bugs Moran, and Vincent Drucci, attempt to kill Al Capone at a South Side, Chicago restaurant.  They fire at Capone's car, injuring his chauffeur but missing Capone. 
January 24 – Weiss, Moran, Drucci, and Frank Gusenberg ambush Chicago Outfit leader Johnny Torrio as he returns from shopping with his wife, shooting him and his chauffeur, Robert Barton, several times. As Moran is about to kill Torrio, the gun misfires.  The gunmen are forced to flee as the police arrive. Soon after this attack, Torrio would retire to Italy, giving leadership of The Outfit to his lieutenant, Capone. 
February 9 – Johnny Torrio is sentenced by Judge Adam Cliffe to nine months in the Lake County Jail, in Waukegan, Illinois, a short distance north of Chicago. Torrio's lawyers ostensibly choose this facility  because Torrio can receive proper medical treatment there; however, the real reason is for Torrio's protection as the Sheriff Edwin Ahlstrom is on Torrio's payroll.  After his release, Torrio would be escorted by Capone out of Lake County. 
May 26 – Shortly after claiming the presidency of the Unione Siciliane, "Bloody" Angelo Genna is killed, possibly by members of the North Side Gang. 
July 14 – James Russo, an independent bootlegger in Chicago's "Little Italy", is killed by Al Capone's gunmen.
August – Leo Lanzetti is killed by Salvatore Sabella in a drive by shooting. 
November 13 – Samuzzo Amatuna, an associate of the Genna crime family, is gunned down outside a West Side Chicago barber shop by members of the North Side Gang. 
November 18 – Amatuna associate and bodyguard Edward Zion is killed shortly after returning from Amatuna's funeral.
November 20 – Amatuna associate and bodyguard Abraham Goldstein is shot and killed by unidentified gunmen while in a drug store.  
December – Saltis-McErlane Gang member Joseph "Dynamite" Brooks is supposedly killed by fellow member Pete Kunski out of professional jealousy.

Births
January 19 – Rocco Chinnici, Italian anti-mafia magistrate
January 26 – Luciano Leggio, Sicilian (Corleonesi) mafia boss
March 7 – Former Genna crime family enforcer Joseph Calabriese.
August 7 – Anthony Gaggi "Nino", high-ranking member of the Gambino crime family
August 16 – William G. Hundley, head of the Justice Department's Organized Crime and Racketeering Section.
December 22, Peter Milano, Los Angeles crime family boss

Deaths
Angelo (May 26), Mike (June 13), and Tony Genna (July 8), three of the six brothers running the Genna crime family, are murdered by the North Side Gang, causing the remaining family to leave Chicago
Sheldon Gang hitman Karl Bates
January 22 – James Patrick O'Leary, Chicago gambling racketeer
November 13 – Samuzzo Amatuna "Samoots", Unione Siciliane president and former member of the recently disbanded Genna Brothers gang. 
November 18 – Edward Zion, Amatuna associate
November 20 – Abraham Goldstein, Amatuna associate
December – Joseph Brooks, Ragen's Colts and Saltis-McErlane Gang member

References 

Organized crime
Years in organized crime